Bonny Lakes are two small, shallow, mountain ponds located in the Eagle Cap Wilderness of Northeastern Oregon, United States. They are positioned in a large meadow on Aneroid Mountain known as Bonny Lakes basin, which is about two miles east of Dollar Lake. Together they are listed as the 13th highest lake in the Eagle Cap Wilderness at 7,840 ft (2,390 m).

Trail
Bonny Lakes can be accessed by either the Wallowa Lake Trailhead (10 miles of travel) or the Tenderfoot Trailhead (3.5 miles of travel). The lakes lie on Trail 1802.

See also
 List of lakes in Oregon

References 

Lakes of Oregon
Lakes of Wallowa County, Oregon
Eagle Cap Wilderness